Mongrel is the third studio album by American rock band the Bob Seger System, released in 1970. During its four-week run on the Billboard 200 chart, the album entered the chart at the end of October 1970, then rose to number 171 two weeks later.

Critical reception 
Rolling Stone reviewed Mongrel on January 7, 1971. Ben Edmonds called the album "...easily [Seger's] best work to date, but there are still some crucial musical problems he must come to grips with if he is to realize the tremendous potential he displayed on his earlier Cameo-Parkway singles (most notably 'Heavy Music' and 'Persecution Smith')." Edmonds continued: "[Seger] writes marvelous rock and roll songs in the virile 1965 mold, somewhat of a lost art these days." The band itself, however, he said, is "like Mountain" and "often degenerates into 'heavy' overstatements of the most clichéd sort." Edmonds called "Lucifer" the strongest cut on the album, but his review may have had a dampening effect on sales.

Track listing

Personnel
Bob Seger – lead guitar, vocals
Dan Honaker – bass, guitar, vocals
Pep Perrine – percussion, drums, vocals
Dan Watson – organ, piano, vocals
Bob Schultz – organ, saxophone, vocals

Production
Producers: Punch Andrews, Bob Seger
Engineer: Jim Bruzzese, Greg Miller
Design: Thomas Weschler
Cover art: Thomas Weschler
Photography: Thomas Weschler

Charts
Album - Billboard (United States)

Singles - Billboard (United States)

References

Bob Seger albums
1970 albums
Albums produced by Punch Andrews
Capitol Records albums